Elm Park is a suburban planned community in East London within the London Borough of Havering. Prior to the construction of the extensive Elm Park Garden City development in the 1930s it was a scattered settlement of farms in the south of the parish of Hornchurch. Elm Park has been connected to central London by the electrified District line service since 1935 and the planned development of the area formed part of the interwar private housing boom that was interrupted by World War II. After the war Elm Park expanded with social housing and it has formed part of Greater London since 1965.

History

Toponymy
The place name Elm Park was devised in 1933. It was derived from Elm Farm, which is first recorded in 1777 and was known as Elms in 1883.

Local government
The area that became Elm Park formed part of the South End ward of the parish of Hornchurch; the large ancient parish occupied the same area as the royal manor and liberty of Havering. The Havering courts and Hornchurch vestry were the principal local government in the area. The liberty was abolished in 1892 and the parish vestry in 1894. Elected local government was incorporated by the Local Government Act 1894. Hornchurch civil parish was governed by Hornchurch Parish Council and formed part of the Romford Rural District, governed by Romford Rural District Council.

As the population was increasing, in 1926 the Hornchurch parish was removed from the rural district to become Hornchurch Urban District and the parish council became Hornchurch Urban District Council. The council, based in Langtons House from 1929, was the planning authority during the transition of Elm Park from farms to suburban development. The Hornchurch Urban District was abolished in 1965 and Elm Park became part of the London Borough of Havering in Greater London.

Urban development
Elm Park Garden City was a planned community by the developer Richard Costain and Sons Ltd., drawing on the ideas of the garden city movement. Costain purchased the land of Wyebridge, Elm and Uphavering farms for the development in 1933. Costain negotiated a higher density of development than was usually permitted. In return the council achieved some improvements, including provision of wider roads, a bridge over the railway line, and the donation of land for Harrow Lodge Park. Costain built an estate office at the corner of Coronation Drive and Maylands Avenue that later became occupied by a real estate solicitor.

Costain negotiated with the London, Midland and Scottish Railway to have a station built on the London to Southend railway that ran through the area and Elm Park Underground station, served by the District line of the London Underground, opened in 1935. The station and the Elm Park Garden City were officially opened by Hilton Young, Minister of Health in May 1935. Celebrations to mark the opening included a performance by the Dagenham Girl Pipers. The Assembly Hall, intended to be used as a recreation space and theatre, was given to the Elm Park Residents' Association, which was established in July 1935. A frequent bus service was provided from 1939.

House building on the estate was halted by World War II. Because of the proximity of RAF Hornchurch the area was subject aerial bombing with some damage to the housing stock. After the war national housing policy had changed and Hornchurch Urban District Council deviated from the Costain plans to provide higher density social housing through compulsory purchase of the land, using loans from the Public Works Loan Board. By 1964 the council had created 1,146 council houses in Elm Park.

Governance
Elm Park is divided between the three wards of Elm Park, Hacton and St Andrew's, all within the London Borough of Havering. Each ward elects three councillors to Havering London Borough Council. The majority of Elm Park is within the Elm Park ward, but the area to the east of The Broadway and north of the railway is in St Andrew's ward; and the area to the south of the railway and to the east of The Broadway is in the Hacton ward. The Elm Park ward is in the Dagenham and Rainham UK Parliament constituency, with the Hacton and St Andrew's wards in the Hornchurch and Upminster constituency. All of Elm Park is within the Havering and Redbridge London Assembly constituency.

Geography
Open spaces in the area include Harrow Lodge Park, Hornchurch Country Park, Swallow Walk, Brettons Park and Eastbrookend Country Park of the Thames Chase forest. Nearest places are Dagenham, Rainham, and Romford.

Demography

The 2001 census shows the Elm Park ward has a population density higher than the borough of Havering, lower than all of London, but much higher than England as a whole. The population is predominately White, 92% within the White British classification, which is typical for the borough, and both higher than London and England. The mean and median average age of the population is 40, which is typical for the borough, about five years above London as a whole and slightly above the average for England.

Economy
Elm Park is identified as a district centre in the London Plan and a priority for regeneration. Within Havering it is near to the major centre at Hornchurch and metropolitan centre at Romford. The compact retail area extends along the whole of The Broadway, which is flanked by the Station Parade and Tadworth Parade precincts, and continues along parts of Elm Park Avenue and Saint Nicholas Avenue. There are 196 units in the town centre. As of November 2012, 13.91% are convenience goods, 30.43% comparison goods, 42.61% services, and 13.04% vacant. These include a variety of independent and high street brand shops, including banks, clothes shops, pharmacies, bakers, greengrocers, fishmongers, florists, opticians, bicycle shops, butchers, hairdressers, grocery stores, off licence, dry cleaners, travel agents, and a post office. The unit sizes are fairly small, with a Tesco Express and The Co-operative Food forming some of the larger stores. In 2013 an M local branded Morrisons convenience store opened and a Sainsbury's  replaced the former Elm Park Hotel. There is a library which has recently been rebuilt. There is a number of takeaways, cafes and restaurants.

Transport
Elm Park is served by Elm Park Underground station and has London Bus services to nearby Romford, Rainham and Hornchurch town centre. Regeneration linked to the Thames Gateway project has been mooted and recent changes such as the installation of new street lighting have been made. The East London Transit includes an option to serve the area.

Elm Park was the site of a derailment of a British Rail commuter service on 29 March 1965 resulting in two deaths and 15 people being injured: an act of vandalism by unknown persons (placing an obstruction on the line) derailed a London Fenchurch St. to Shoeburyness passenger train travelling at 70 m.p.h.

Culture and community
Regeneration in the area is led by Havering London Borough Council and the Elm Park Regeneration Partnership. Elm Park is served by several churches - the Elm Park Baptist Church, St Albans Catholic Church, and St. Nicholas Church of England. It is also home to Arise Metropolitan Assembly which meets at the annex of the Elm Park Community Assembly Hall on Eyhurst/St.Nicholas Avenue, Christ Life Church and Eagles Christian Connections. It is also in Elm Park that the London Metropolitan Assembly convened by Apostle George Akalonu meets each month to discuss issues of common interest to faith, civic and community leaders.

See also
List of people from Havering
List of schools in Havering

References

Areas of London
Districts of the London Borough of Havering
Planned communities
1935 establishments in England
District centres of London